The following lists events that happened during 1901 in the Empire of the Great Qing.

Incumbents
Guangxu Emperor (22nd year)

Events
August - Eight-legged essay in imperial examinations is abolished
September 7 - Boxer Protocol

Births
April 13 - Zhao Shiyan
August 26 - Chen Yi (general)
November 6 - Yang Kaihui

Deaths
November 7 - Li Hongzhang

 
1900s in China
Years of the 20th century in China
China
China